Through the 2022 season, 134 golfers have won one of women's golf's LPGA majors. They are listed here in order of their first win. For a complete list of results in these tournaments see the LPGA majors article.

Notes and references

See also
List of LPGA major championship winning golfers
Chronological list of men's major golf champions

 
LPGA major chronology